HP9 or variant, may refer to:

 HP9, a postcode for Beaconsfield, see HP postcode area
 Norinco HP9-1, a shotgun
 Schreder Airmate HP-9, a glider
 HP 9g, a Hewlett Packard graphing calculator

See also
 HP (disambiguation)